Escobar, Inc. is a company registered in Guaynabo, Puerto Rico, tied to various scams involving selling smartphones and flamethrowers with Escobar Inc branding without delivering the products to customers. It was established on April 20, 2015. The company is known for its association with Roberto de Jesús Escobar Gaviria, the brother of Pablo Escobar, and various scams.

History
The company was formed into a legal corporation on April 20, 2015 in Puerto Rico.

Conflict with Netflix
On July 1, 2016, Escobar, Inc. sent a letter to Netflix, Inc. regarding the series Narcos demanding $1 billion in payment for unauthorized usage of content. On September 11, 2017, Carlos Muñoz Portal, a location scout from Netflix, was found assassinated in his car in Mexico. Roberto Escobar denied any involvement and offered to provide hitmen as security for Netflix. On November 6, 2017, Escobar, Inc. abandoned the dispute.

Donald Trump
On January 8, 2019, Pablo Escobar´s brother Robert Escobar, launched a $50 million GoFundMe fundraiser on behalf of Escobar, Inc. in an effort to impeach President Trump. The page was promptly removed from the platform.

Elon Musk and The Boring Company
In July 2019, Escobar, Inc. started selling a propane torch made to look like a flamethrower and accused The Boring Company CEO Elon Musk of intellectual property theft, alleging that The Boring Company's promotional Not-a-Flamethrower is based on a design that Roberto Escobar discussed in 2017 with an engineer associated with Musk. Via media, Escobar, Inc. publicly offered Musk a settlement of $100 million in cash or Tesla shares; otherwise they would use the legal system to take over Tesla. No action has been taken since. Customers who paid for the Escobar, Inc. flamethrower reportedly received a printed certificate of ownership instead of the ordered product. Buyers had disputes filed with PayPal denied after Escobar, Inc. provided the tracking information used to send the certificate as proof of delivery. PayPal later closed its accounts with Escobar, Inc.

PabloEscobar.com
On August 28, 2019, Escobar, Inc. filed a UDRP complaint regarding cybersquatting of the domain PabloEscobar.com with the then-National Arbitration Forum. The prior owner demanded $3 million for the domain name and on October 7, 2019, the case was ruled in the favor of the company with the domain name ordered to be transferred to the company.

Smartphones
On December 2, 2019, Escobar, Inc. released what it called the Escobar Fold 1 smartphone featuring a flexible screen, which ended up being a rebadged Royole FlexPai. Two months later, on February 10, 2020, the Escobar Fold 2 was released, which is a Galaxy Fold with poorly added Escobar branding. Many customers, when ordering the phones, said that they never received them, with only tech influencers actually receiving products. It has also been alleged that Escobar Inc sent bogus product orders consisting of a book, allowing Escobar Inc to claim the phone had been shipped out. In May 2020, the company released a refurbished version of the iPhone 11 Pro and allegedly sued Apple for $2.6 billion.

References

Pablo Escobar